Xırmandalı or Charmandaly or Kharmandali or Kharmandaly or Khyrmandaly may refer to:
Xırmandalı, Bilasuvar, Azerbaijan
Xırmandalı, Masally, Azerbaijan